Ruislip is a London Underground station in Ruislip in west London. The station is on the Uxbridge branch of both the Metropolitan line and Piccadilly line, between Ruislip Manor and Ickenham stations. The station is located on Station Approach. It is in Travelcard Zone 6. It is the oldest station on the Uxbridge branch and was originally the only intermediate station on the line between Uxbridge and Harrow-on-the-Hill.

History

The Metropolitan Railway (Harrow and Uxbridge Railway) constructed the line between Harrow-on-the-Hill and Uxbridge and commenced services on 4 July 1904 with, initially, Ruislip being the only intermediate stop. At first, services were operated by steam trains, but track electrification was completed in the subsequent months and electric trains began operating on 1 January 1905. The formation was made wide enough at Ruislip to enable another pair of tracks to be constructed as passing loops or additional platform roads. Neither has ever occurred.

On 1 March 1910, an extension of the District line from South Harrow to connect with the Metropolitan Railway at Rayners Lane was opened enabling District line trains to serve stations between Rayners Lane and Uxbridge from that date. On 23 October 1933, District line services were replaced by Piccadilly line trains.

Currently, only the station's eastbound (Central London) platform has step-free access. Passengers who wish to travel in the Uxbridge direction and are unable to use the footbridge (which is the only link between the westbound platform and the entrance/exit) must travel to Northwick Park or Sudbury Town and change direction there. In 2018, it was announced that the station will be made fully accessible, as part of a £200m investment to increase the number of accessible stations on the Tube.

It is possible to reverse trains from west to east at Ruislip. Trains must detrain in the westbound platform and then continue for approximately half a mile to a reversing siding leading to Ruislip Depot. After reversing, the train must come back the way it came and enter the eastbound platform by means of a crossover. Unfortunately, while this manoeuvre is carried out, both the westbound and eastbound services are held up. Therefore, this manoeuvre is usually only done by some peak-hour Piccadilly line trains due to the inconvenience it causes. There was formerly a crossover to the east of the station enabling trains to leave the westbound platform in an easterly direction, and a goods yard to the north of the line.

Services

Metropolitan line 

The Metropolitan Line is the only line to operate an express service, though currently for Metropolitan Line trains on the Uxbridge branch this is eastbound only in the morning peaks (06:30 to 09:30) Monday to Friday.

The off-peak service in trains per hour (tph) is:
 8tph Eastbound to Aldgate via Baker Street (all stations)
 8tph Westbound to Uxbridge

The morning peak service in trains per hour (tph) is:
 2tph Eastbound to Aldgate via Baker Street (semi-fast)
 4tph Eastbound to Aldgate via Baker Street (all stations)
 4tph Eastbound to Baker Street (all stations)
 10tph Westbound to Uxbridge

The evening peak service in trains per hour (tph) is:
 7tph Eastbound to Aldgate via Baker Street (all stations)
 3tph Eastbound to Baker Street (all stations)
 10tph Westbound to Uxbridge

Piccadilly line

Between Rayners Lane and Uxbridge there is no Piccadilly Line service before approximately 06:30 (Monday - Friday) and 08:45 (Saturday - Sunday), except for one early morning
departure from Uxbridge at 05:18 (Monday - Saturday) and 06:46 (Sunday).

The off-peak service in trains per hour (tph) is:
 3tph Eastbound to Cockfosters
 3tph Westbound to Uxbridge

The peak time service in trains per hour (tph) is:
 6tph Eastbound to Cockfosters
 6tph Westbound to Uxbridge

Connections
London Buses routes 114, 278, 331, 398, E7, H13, U1 and U10 serve the station.

See also 
Other London Underground stations in Ruislip:
 Ruislip Gardens
 Ruislip Manor
 South Ruislip
 West Ruislip

References

External links

 
 
 
 
 

Former Metropolitan Railway stations
Metropolitan line stations
Piccadilly line stations
Railway stations in Great Britain opened in 1904
Tube stations in the London Borough of Hillingdon
Grade II listed buildings in the London Borough of Hillingdon